Ozothamnus ledifolius is a shrub, from the family Asteraceae and one of 54 species from the genus Ozothamnus. Harold Frederick Comber (1897–1969), an English horticulturist and plant collector, introduced Ozothamnus ledifolius in 1929 on mountains of Tasmania above 2500 ft. high from the seeds collected from 4000 ft. height.

Etymology 
The famous Scottish botanist Robert Brown (1773–1858) [author abbreviation is R.Br.] erected the genus Ozothamnus in taxonomical classification. Ozothamnus ledifolius species was first described by Augustin Pyramus de Candolle (1778–1841) [author abbreviation is DC.]. Joseph Dalton Hooker (1817–1911) [author abbreviation is Hook. f.] reclassified Ozothamnus ledifolius in modern botanical classification system. The other synonym of Ozothamnus ledifolius is Cassinia ledifolia, which was coined by Allan Cunningham (1791–1839) [author abbreviation is A. Cunn.] and Helichrysum ledifolium, which was coined by George Bentham (1800–1884) [author abbreviation is Benth.].

Ozothamnus ledifolius is commonly known as Kerosene Bush, because of its aromatic scent drifted during warm weather and highly flammable nature. It is also known as mountain everlasting bush and mountain spice in different mountains of Tasmania.

Taxonomy 

All the species of genus Ozothamnus are shrubs and among 54 species 44 species are restricted to Australia. Ozothamnus is from daisy family (asteraceae), which ranks under eudicots. Thus Ozothamnus ledifolius shows special types of flower inflorescence and have true dicotyledons. Gnaphalieae (tribe) is the hypernym of Ozothamnus, which is commonly known as pussy's-toes tribe.

Description

Growth 

Ozothamnus ledifolius species are slow growing woody shrubs, between 1-2m height. It is found as dense rounded shrubs and erect stems are observed, which are yellowish-green in colour. The juvenile stems are downy. These shrubs have draught and heavy frost resistance. The species propagates from seeds to semi-ripe and ripe-wood cuttings (cud-weed).

Leaves 

The lanceolate leaves of Ozothamnus ledifolius are evergreen, neat and glossy above and downy underneath, with a revolute margin, and produce a peppery fragrance in summer due to the leaf exudates that include a series of flavonoid aglycones and mostly consist of mixture of terpenoids. In resinous material of leaf exudate four sesquiterpenes, a diterpenediol and two pentacyclic triterpene acids are present. The phenolic portion of exudate encompasses three phenylethyl esters.

Flowers 

The flowers of Ozothamnus ledifolius are white and small. Orange buds open to white flower heads in late spring. The flowers are clustered with longer stalks and formed a convex flower head (corymbs).  They are arranged in a radiating pattern (many stellate). The fragrance of the flowers attracts bees, birds and butterflies.

Fruits 

Ozothamnus ledifolius produce one seeded fruit that does not open to release seed (achene). The maximum observed seed dormancy is two months. Seeds take two to four weeks to germinate.

Distribution 

Ozothamnus ledifolius is an endemic species of Tasmania and forms alpine cushion in alpine heath vegetation. It is also found in rock gardens. Ozothamnus ledifolius occurs near the summit-viewing region of Mt. Wellington in Hobart. It is known as mountain everlasting bush in Derwent Valley, at Mt. Field National Park (Lake Belcher track).

Occurrence and distribution of Ozothamnus ledifolius

Cultivation 

Ozothamnus ledifolius has a large capacity for photosynthetic light consumption, thus its need for low light indulgence. Thus it needs a sunny sheltered place where sun is not overhead. For growth, it needs acidic, sandy, constantly moist and well-drained soil. Other perennial weeds may hinder the growth of Ozothamnus ledifolius. It is also phosphorus intolerant.

Conservation 

The conservation status of Ozothamnus ledifolius is very poor in Tasmania and constricted to Mt. Wellington Park.

Uses 

The daisy family is commonly used as ornamental plants. Ozothamnus ledifolius are used as Mediterranean designs in coastal beds, slopes and banks. It is also used as ornamental informal or formal edging and as borders. Trimming the stems promotes bushy growth.

References 

ledifolius
Flora of Tasmania